The 2019–20 Ball State Cardinals men's basketball team represent Ball State University during the 2019–20 NCAA Division I men's basketball season. The Cardinals, led by seventh-year head coach James Whitford, play their home games at Worthen Arena as members of the West Division of the Mid-American Conference.

Previous season
The Cardinals finished the 2018–19 season 16–17, 6–12 to finish in fifth place in the MAC West division. They lost in the quarterfinals of the MAC tournament to Bowling Green.

Roster

Schedule and results

|-
!colspan=9 style=| Non-conference regular season
|-

|-
!colspan=9 style=| MAC regular season

|-
!colspan=9 style=| MAC tournament

See also
 2019–20 Ball State Cardinals women's basketball team

References

2019–20 Mid-American Conference men's basketball season
2019-20
2020 in sports in Indiana
2019 in sports in Indiana